The Youyi Bridge (meaning Friendship Bridge) is a bridge on the Karakoram Highway  at Thakot in Khyber-Pakhtunkhwa province of Pakistan. Its inauguration was on August 27, 2004.

The bridge spans the Indus river, and was constructed next to a bridge built between 1966 and 1978.  The bridge was given its Chinese name in 2004 to honour the Chinese and Pakistani workers killed in the construction of the Karakoram Highway.

References

Bridges in Pakistan
Bridges over the Indus River
China–Pakistan border
Battagram District
Bridges completed in 1978
1978 establishments in Pakistan